Jannicke Stålstrøm (born 7 September 1969) is a Norwegian windsurfer. She was born in Tønsberg, and represents Horten Seilforening. She competed at the 2004, 2008 and 2012 Summer Olympics.

References

External links
 
 
 

1969 births
Living people
Norwegian windsurfers
Female windsurfers
Norwegian female sailors (sport)
Olympic sailors of Norway
Sailors at the 2004 Summer Olympics – Mistral One Design
Sailors at the 2008 Summer Olympics – RS:X
Sailors at the 2012 Summer Olympics – RS:X
People from Horten
Sportspeople from Tønsberg
Sportspeople from Vestfold og Telemark